Himalzaleptus quinqueconicus is a species of harvestmen in a monotypic genus in the family Sclerosomatidae from Nepal.

References

Harvestmen
Monotypic arachnid genera